(born March 13, 1974) is a former Japanese female singer who was affiliated with Hello! Project.

Career
She began her career as a Japanese idol with the all-girl group Osaka Performance Doll from 1993 to 1996.  She then joined the new Hello! Project group Taiyo to Ciscomoon (later named "T&C Bomber") in 1999, until its end in late 2000. She stayed with Hello! Project as a chorus member and dancer, and appeared in the temporary Hello! Project shuffle units Aoiro 7, 7Air, H.P. All Stars, and Puripuri Pink.  On October 30, 2009, she announced that her contract with Up-Front Agency, the parent company to Hello! Project, had ended.

Performances

Television

Radio

References

External links 
  Hello! Project official profile

Japanese idols
Japanese women pop singers
Hello! Project solo singers
Japanese television personalities
Living people
1974 births
Musicians from Osaka Prefecture
People from Suita